Campbell Creek (Dena'ina: Qin Cheghitnu) is one of several streams that flow through the city of Anchorage, Alaska.

The main stem of the creek is formed at the junction of the North and South Forks, which flows in a south-westerly direction through Campbell Lake, before reaching the Turnagain Arm. The watershed of the Campbell Creek includes a number of tributaries, including the Little Campbell Creek, the Lower Campbell Creek, and the Middle Fork.

The creek connects a number of parks, open spaces and lakes to form a green corridor running from east to west through the city. The paved Campbell Creek trail follows the creek for much of its lower course through the areas from Campbell Park to Campbell Lake, over a distance of seven miles.

History
Before English-speaking settlers arrived in Anchorage, the Dena'ina inhabited the area. They called the creek Qin Cheghitnu or Crying Ridge Creek. The Crying Ridge referred to Tanaina Peak in the Chugach Mountains, in the upper reaches of the creek, which was considered to be a place of bereavement.

The European name of Campbell Creek is a derivative of Point Campbell, where the Knik and Turnagain arms of Cook Inlet meet.

Usage 
During summer, Campbell Creek is popular for inner tubing and kayaking.

Hydrology
The discharge of the Campbell Creek has been measured by the USGS since 1966.

See also
Ship Creek, Alaska
Chester Creek (Alaska)
Campbell Lake
List of rivers of Alaska

References

Rivers of Anchorage, Alaska
Rivers of Alaska